Khuralgarh Sahib is one of the most prominent historical place of Ravidasi communities like Ad-Dharmi, Chamar, Ramdasia Sikhs and Mochis. It is situated at village Kharali, Garhshanker, Hoshiarpur district. Khuralgarh Sahib is also called Charan Choh Ganga Sri Guru Ravidas Ji as this place was visited by Sri Guru Ravidas

Minar-e-Begampura
Minar-e-Begampura is 151 feet high hallmark of Guru Ravidass Memorial at Shri Khuralgarh Sahib in Khuralgarh village. This memorial is said to have a spacious congregation hall having the capacity to accommodate 10000 pilgrims. Also there is state-of-the art auditorium equipped with all the modern audio-visual aids to showcase the life works of Guru Ravidass and would accommodate nearly 500 pilgrims during any function or event. Guru Ravidass Memorial is built at 14.4 acre of land and is expected to be completed by November 2016.

Foundation stone
On 3 April 2016, foundation stone of Minar-e-Begampura was laid by the Chief Minister of Punjab.

See also
Shri Guru Ravidas Gurughar

References

External links
Jagatguru Ravidass Ji Maharaj's Historical place, Khuralgarh, Punjab
मुयमंत्री द्वारा गांव खुरालगढ़ में गुरू रविदास जी की यादगार के निर्माण के लिए स्वीकृति

Gurdwaras in Punjab, India
Religious buildings and structures completed in 1783